George David Withers (7 March 1917 – 15 April 1991) was an  Australian rules footballer who played with Hawthorn in the Victorian Football League (VFL).

Notes

External links 

1917 births
1991 deaths
Australian rules footballers from New South Wales
Hawthorn Football Club players
Prahran Football Club players